Viru Viru International Airport  in Santa Cruz de la Sierra is Bolivia's largest international airport. Viru Viru handles domestic, regional, and international flights from Bolivia, North America, South America and Europe and is the hub for Bolivia's biggest airline Boliviana de Aviación. The airport is able to handle large aircraft such as the Boeing 747-400, Airbus A340-600 and Boeing 777-300ER.

History 
The airport was opened in 1983, to replace the obsolete El Trompillo Airport. Upon its inauguration, Viru Viru became a main gateway for international flights. Lloyd Aéreo Boliviano used Viru Viru as a hub before ceasing operations in 2008. On 1 March 1997, the government of Bolivia entered into a 25-year contract with Airport Group International to operate the three largest airports in Bolivia — El Alto International Airport in La Paz, Jorge Wilstermann International Airport in Cochabamba and Viru Viru International Airport. Servicios de Aeropuertos Bolivianos Sociedad Anonima (SABSA) was created to operate the concession. In 1999, Airport Group International was purchased by TBI plc. In 2004, Spain's Abertis/AENA purchased TBI.
SABSA has been substituted in March of 2022 by the newly established government agency Navegación Aérea y Aeropuertos Bolivianos (NAABOL).  This state-owned agency now manages the airports in Bolivia.

Airlines and destinations

Passenger

Cargo

Statistics

Top destinations

References

Buildings and structures in Santa Cruz de la Sierra
Airports in Santa Cruz Department (Bolivia)
Airports established in 1983
1983 establishments in Bolivia